Royal Basketball Club Pepinster is a Belgian basketball club that is located in the Verviers-Pepinster area of Liège Province, Belgium. The club currently competes in the Belgian Fifth Division, the fifth tier of Belgian basketball. Before, the team used to be a regular participant of the Basketball League Belgium. The team club plays its home games at the 4,000 seat Hall du Paire.

History
Verviers-Pepinster was the runner-up of the Belgian League twice: in 2003 and 2014. The club also won the Belgian Cup in 1980, and the Belgian Supercup in 2003.

On 29 June 2016, it was announced that the club would leave the Belgian League, due to a lack of budget.

Honors and titles
Belgian Cup 
Winners (1): 1979–80
Belgian Supercup 
Winners (1): 2003

Season by season

Notable players

Head coaches

Sponsorship names
Due to sponsorship reasons, the club has been known as:
Go Pass Verviers-Pepinster (1995–1996)
VOO Verviers-Pepinster (2007–2013)
VOO Wolves Verviers-Pepinster (2013–2015)

Logos

References

External links
Official Site 
Eurobasket.com Team Page

Basketball teams in Belgium
Basketball teams established in 1938
Sport in Liège Province
Pepinster
Verviers